Knickerbocker Theatre may refer to:

 Knickerbocker Theatre (Broadway)
 Knickerbocker Theatre (Washington, D.C.)